Anne-Marie  (born 30 August 1946 as Princess Anne-Marie of Denmark) is a Greek and Danish royal who was the last queen of Greece as the consort of King Constantine II from their marriage on 19 September 1964 until the abolition of the Greek monarchy on 1 June 1973.

Anne-Marie is the youngest daughter of King Frederick IX and Queen Ingrid of Denmark. In 1964, Anne-Marie married Constantine and became queen consort of Greece. They had five children: Princess Alexia, Crown Prince Pavlos, Prince Nikolaos, Princess Theodora, and Prince Philippos. As queen, Anne-Marie spent much of her time working for a charitable foundation known as "Her Majesty's Fund" and later as the "Anne-Marie Foundation", which provided assistance to people in rural areas of Greece. In 1967, however, the royal family were forced into exile, and Constantine was later deposed as Greece transitioned into a republic.

Anne-Marie is the youngest sister of Queen Margrethe II of Denmark. She is also a first cousin of King Carl XVI Gustaf of Sweden and a second cousin of King Harald V of Norway. Anne-Marie and her husband Constantine were third cousins: they shared King Christian IX of Denmark as patrilineal great-great-grandfather. They also shared Queen Victoria as a great-great-grandmother.

Biography

Birth and family 

Princess Anne-Marie was born on 30 August 1946 in Frederick VIII's Palace, an 18th-century palace which forms part of the Amalienborg Palace complex in central Copenhagen. She was the third and last daughter and child of Crown Prince Frederik  and Crown Princess Ingrid of Denmark. Her father was the eldest son of King Christian X of Denmark and his wife, Alexandrine of Mecklenburg-Schwerin; her mother, born a Princess of Sweden, was the only daughter of the Crown Prince of Sweden and his late British-born first wife, Princess Margaret of Connaught, daughter of the Duke of Connaught. At birth, Anne-Marie had two elder sisters: Princess Margrethe, the present Queen of Denmark, and Princess Benedikte, who married Prince Richard of Sayn-Wittgenstein-Berleburg and lives in Germany.

Anne-Marie was baptised on 9 October 1946 in the Holmen Church in Copenhagen. Her godparents are the King and Queen of Denmark (paternal grandparents); Crown Prince of Sweden (maternal grandfather), Prince Bertil of Sweden (maternal uncle), the King of Norway (paternal grand-uncle), Prince George of Greece and Denmark, the Crown Princess of Norway (father's first cousin), Queen Mary of the United Kingdom, Princess Dagmar of Denmark (paternal grand-aunt) and the Crown Princess of the Netherlands.

She is a great-great granddaughter of Queen Victoria, thus a third cousin to the late Queen Elizabeth II and her late husband Prince Philip, Duke of Edinburgh, as well as of King Juan Carlos I of Spain, King Michael I of Romania.  Through her mother, Queen Ingrid born princess of Sweden, she is also a first cousin of King Carl XVI Gustaf of Sweden and a second cousin to King Harald V of Norway.

Early life 

Princess Anne-Marie and her sisters grew up in apartments at Frederick VIII's Palace at Amalienborg in Copenhagen and in Fredensborg Palace in North Zealand. She spent summer holidays with the royal family in her parents' summer residence at Gråsten Palace in Southern Jutland. On 20 April 1947, less than a year after Princess Anne-Marie's birth, her grandfather King Christian X died, and her father ascended the throne as King Frederick IX.

At the time of her father's accession to the throne, only males could ascend the throne of Denmark. As Anne-Marie's parents had no sons, it was assumed that her uncle Prince Knud would one day assume the throne. The popularity of Frederick IX and his daughters and the more prominent role of women in Danish life paved the way for a new Act of Succession in 1953 which permitted female succession to the throne following the principle of male-preference primogeniture, where a female can ascend to the throne if she has no brothers. Her eldest sister Margrethe therefore became heir presumptive, and Princess Benedikte and Princess Anne-Marie became second and third in the line of succession.

Anne-Marie was educated at N. Zahle's School, a private school in Copenhagen, from 1952 to 1961. In 1961 she attended the Chatelard School for Girls, an English boarding school outside Montreux in Switzerland. In 1963 and 1964 she attended the Institut Le Mesnil, a Swiss finishing school also in Montreux.

Marriage

In 1959, at the age of thirteen, Anne-Marie first met her future husband, her third cousin Constantine, Crown Prince of Greece, who accompanied his parents, King Paul and Queen Frederica, on a state visit to Denmark. They met a second time in Denmark in 1961, when Constantine declared to his parents his intention to marry Anne-Marie. They met again in Athens in May 1962 at the marriage of Constantine's sister Princess Sofia of Greece and Denmark to Prince Juan Carlos of Spain at which Anne-Marie was a bridesmaid: and again in 1963 at the centenary celebrations of the Greek monarchy.

On 6 March 1964, King Paul died, and Constantine succeeded him as King of the Hellenes. In July 1964, the announcement of the engagement of Constantine and Anne-Marie raised the polite protests of the Left in Denmark. Anne-Marie and Constantine were married on 18 September 1964 (two weeks after Anne-Marie's 18th birthday) in the Metropolis, the Greek Orthodox Cathedral of Athens. Prior to the wedding, Anne-Marie converted from Lutheranism to the Greek Orthodox Church. Also, in view of the fact that she was marrying a foreign ruler, consent to the marriage was given on the condition that Anne-Marie renounce her succession rights to the Danish throne for herself and her descendants.

Queen of the Hellenes 

As Queen of Greece, Anne-Marie spent much of her time working for a charitable foundation known as "Her Majesty's Fund" and later as the "Anne-Marie Foundation", which provided assistance to people in rural areas of Greece. On 10 July 1965, Queen Anne-Marie gave birth at the villa Mon Repos in Corfu to her first child, Princess Alexia, who was heir presumptive to the throne of Greece, from her birth until the birth of her younger brother Crown Prince Pavlos on 20 May 1967, Greece's order of succession adhering to male-preference primogeniture.

Exile 

In April 1967, Anne-Marie's husband King Constantine II, after a military coup, swore into office a military junta. In December 1967, the King attempted to shake off the authoritarian regime and tried to stage a counter-coup with the help of certain like-minded people. The counter-coup failed and Anne-Marie and her family had to flee to Italy. In the aftermath, Anne-Marie miscarried a child. The family lived for two months in the Greek embassy in Rome and then for the next five years in a house in a suburb of Rome.

In 1973, Anne-Marie moved with her family to England. They lived first in Chobham in Surrey. Later they moved to the London suburb of Hampstead. The Greek government seized their former private home of Tatoi. It was only after a successful appeal to the European Court of Human Rights that the Greek government were forced to pay compensation for the property. King Constantine used the money obtained to establish the Anna-Maria Foundation, which was established in 2003 to provide aid to victims of natural disasters, including earthquakes and floods, in Greece.  Anne-Marie serves as president of the foundation.

Current activities 
In 1980 Anne-Marie and Constantine founded Hellenic College of London, a bilingual school where her own children were educated. The school closed in 2005.

The government of Greece did not permit Anne-Marie to return to Greece until 1981 when she was allowed to enter Greek territory for several hours to attend the funeral of her mother-in-law, Queen Frederika. She and her family paid a private visit to Greece in 1993. Since 2003 – when a property dispute between her husband Constantine and the government of Greece concluded – Anne-Marie has visited Greece numerous times. In 2013, Constantine returned to reside in Greece. He and his wife Anne-Marie purchased a villa in Porto Cheli, Peloponnese residing there until they relocated to Athens in the spring of 2022.

On 21 May 2004 Anne-Marie was peripherally involved in a dispute in Madrid between former Crown Prince Vittorio Emanuele of Italy and his cousin and dynastic rival Prince Amedeo of Savoy-Aosta. At a soirée held at the Zarzuela Palace during the wedding celebrations of Felipe, Prince of Asturias, Amedeo approached Vittorio who reportedly punched him twice in the face, causing him to stumble backward down the steps. The quick intervention of Anne-Marie, who propped him up, prevented Amedeo from falling to the ground. She discreetly assisted him indoors while stanching his bleeding facial wounds until first aid was administered. Upon learning of the incident Spain's King Juan Carlos, a cousin of both men, reportedly declared that "never again" would an opportunity to abuse his hospitality be afforded the competing pretenders.

On 14 August 2004, Anne-Marie and her husband Constantine visited their former home in Athens, the former Royal Palace that is now the Presidential Palace, for the first time since 1967. They were received by then-President of Greece Costis Stephanopoulos along with other members of the International Olympic Committee, of which Constantine was an honorary member of. In December 2004, Constantine, Anne-Marie and their children were again invited to pay a personal private visit by President Stephanopoulos.

On 10 January 2023, Anne-Marie was widowed when her husband died of a stroke at the private Hygeia Hospital in Athens at the age of 82.

Titles, styles, honours, and arms

Titles and styles
She has been the titular Queen of the Hellenes since 1973. This title is not recognized under the terms of the republican Constitution of Greece.

 9 October 1946 – 18 September 1964: Her Royal Highness Princess Anne-Marie of Denmark
 18 September 1964 – 1 June 1973: Her Majesty The Queen of the Hellenes, Princess of Denmark
 1 June 1973 – present: Her Majesty Queen Anne-Marie of the Hellenes, Princess of Denmark

Honours

National
 : Knight of the Order of the Elephant (R.E.)
 : Dame of the Royal Family Order of King Frederik IX
 : Dame of the Royal Family Order of Queen Margrethe II
 : Recipient of the Silver Anniversary Medal of Queen Margrethe II and Prince Henrik
 : Recipient of the 75th Birthday Medal of Queen Margrethe II
 : Recipient of the Ruby Jubilee Medal of Queen Margrethe II
 : Recipient of the 70th Birthday Medal of Queen Margrethe II
 : Recipient of the Silver Jubilee Medal of Queen Margrethe II
 : Recipient of the Golden Anniversary Medal of Queen Margrethe II and Prince Henrik
 : Recipient of the Prince Henrik's Commemorative Medal
 : Recipient of the 80th Birthday Medal of Queen Margrethe II
 : Recipient of the Golden Jubilee Medal of Queen Margrethe II
  Greek Royal Family: Knight Grand Cross of the Royal Order of the Redeemer
  Greek Royal Family: Grand Mistress & Dame Grand Cross of the Royal Order of Saints Olga and Sophia
  Greek Royal Family: Grand Mistress Dame Grand Cross of the Royal Order of Beneficence
  Greek Royal Family: Recipient of the Commemorative Badge of the Centenary of the Kingdom of Greece

Foreign
  Empire of Iran: Recipient of the Commemorative Medal of the 2,500 year celebration of the Persian Empire
 : Recipient of the Wedding Medal of Princess Beatrix, Princess of Orange and Claus Van Amsberg
 : Recipient of the 85th Birthday Badge Medal of King Gustaf VI Adolf
 : Recipient of the Commemorative Badge of the 50th Birthday Medal of King Carl XVI Gustaf
  : King Rama IX Royal Cypher Medal, First Class .

Arms and monogram

The coats of arms of Queen Anne-Marie combine the 1936–1973 royal coat of arms of Greece and the 1948–1972 coat of arms of Denmark which was current at the time of her marriage in 1964. The Danish coat of arms is almost identical with the dynastic arms inescutcheon in the Greek coat of arms, which equals the Danish coat of arms of 1819–1903. The only difference is that the Greek arms also include Iceland's white stockfish on red in the lower dexter corner.

Issue 

Constantine and Anne-Marie have five children and nine grandchildren.

Princess Alexia of Greece and Denmark (born 10 July 1965 at Mon Repos, Corfu, Greece). She was married on 9 July 1999 in London to Carlos Morales Quintana. They have four children:
Arrietta Morales y de Grecia (b. 24 Feb 2002)
Ana-Maria Morales y de Grecia (b. 15 May 2003)
Carlos Morales y de Grecia (b. 30 Jul 2005)
Amelia Morales y de Grecia (b. 26 Oct 2007)
Crown Prince Pavlos of Greece, Prince of Denmark (born 20 May 1967 at Tatoi Palace). He was married on 1 July 1995 in London to Marie-Chantal Miller. They have five children:
Princess Maria-Olympia of Greece and Denmark (b. 25 Jul 1996)
 Prince Constantine Alexios of Greece and Denmark (b. 29 Oct 1998)
 Prince Achileas-Andreas of Greece and Denmark (b. 12 Aug 2000)
 Prince Odysseas Kymon of Greece and Denmark (b. 17 Sep 2004)
 Prince Aristidis Stavros of Greece and Denmark (b. 29 Jun 2008)
Prince Nikolaos of Greece and Denmark (born 1 October 1969 in Rome). On 25 August 2010 on the Greek island of Spetses, he married Tatiana Blatnik, who has been styled thereafter as Princess Tatiana of Greece and Denmark.
Princess Theodora of Greece and Denmark (born 9 June 1983 in St Mary's Hospital, London).
Prince Philippos of Greece and Denmark (born 26 April 1986 in St Mary's Hospital, London). On 12 December 2020 in St. Moritz, he married Nina Flohr in a civil ceremony. The religious ceremony took place in Athen's Cathedral on October 26th, 2021.

Ancestors

References

Citations

Bibliography

External links 

 The Royal House of Greece
 The Official Website of the Greek Royal Family

1946 births
20th-century Greek people
21st-century Greek people
20th-century Greek women
21st-century Greek women
House of Glücksburg (Greece)
House of Glücksburg (Denmark)
Greek queens consort
Members of the Church of Greece
Converts to Eastern Orthodoxy from Lutheranism
Danish people of Swedish descent
Danish princesses
Greek emigrants to England
Living people
Danish emigrants to Greece
Greek people of Swedish descent
Danish emigrants to England
Daughters of kings